Bobby Gibson is an American politician and educator serving as a member of the Connecticut House of Representatives from the 15th district. He assumed office on January 12, 2018.

Early life and education 
Gibson was born in Bloomfield, Connecticut. After attending Southern Connecticut State University, he earned a Bachelor of Arts degree from Charter Oak State College. He later earned a Master of Arts from the Graduate Institute in Bethany, Connecticut.

Career 
For over 15 years, Gibson has worked as a teacher and football coach for Bloomfield Public Schools and Hartford Public Schools. In 2015, he joined the Capitol Region Education Council. Gibson was elected to the Connecticut House of Representatives in a special election and assumed office on January 12, 2018. In the 2021–2022 legislative session, Gibson is the vice chair of the House General Law Committee. He is also an assistant majority leader of the House.

References 

Living people
People from Bloomfield, Connecticut
Democratic Party members of the Connecticut House of Representatives
African-American state legislators in Connecticut
Charter Oak State College alumni
Year of birth missing (living people)
21st-century African-American people